Reverend Samuel King (April 29, 1775 – September 13, 1842), was a Presbyterian minister and one of the founders of the Cumberland Presbyterian Church.

King was born in North Carolina (in either Iredell County or Rowan County) of Scots-Irish parents Robert King (15 January 1736 – 6 January 1806) and Mary Morrison (1758 – 1817). He was the 5th of 12 children. He married Anna Dixon (December 23, 1778 – 3 December 18??) on the August 25, 1795 in Sumner County, Tennessee. He founded the Cumberland Presbyterian Church in 1810 in Tennessee along with Samuel McAdoo and Finnis Ewing.

References

1775 births
1842 deaths
Cumberland Presbyterian Church ministers